The 1941 Akron Zippers football team was an American football team that represented the University of Akron as an independent during the 1941 college football season. In its first season under head coach Otis Douglas, the team compiled a 5–3–1 record and outscored opponents by a total of 114 to 76. Andy Maluke was the team captain. The team played its home games at the Rubber Bowl in Akron, Ohio

Schedule

References

Akron
Akron Zips football seasons
Akron Zippers football